The Pantai Remis landslide was a rock fall and flood that occurred on 21 October 1993, near Pantai Remis in Perak, Malaysia. The landslide took place in an abandoned open cast tin mine (in a region of the state well known for its tin mining industry) close to the Strait of Malacca.

YouTube video
A video of the event was uploaded to YouTube on 17 May 2007. The accompanying description in Cantonese reads: 
"That year, I received a call by the owner of a tin mine. He said that his mine, which had been running for a few decades, was about to collapse. I rushed to the scene with my video camera and waited for a few hours. Finally, I took this valuable footage. Although the footage lasted only a few minutes, it is horribly exciting enough. I hope that this video can let you all appreciate the consequence of ruining our environment".

Prof. Dave Petley, the Wilson Chair in Hazard and Risk in the Department of Geography at the University of Durham, England, and founder and director of the International Landslide Centre, described the recording as the best landslide video he had ever seen, despite its poor resolution.

References

External links
Video of the event
Upscaled video of the event
Blog on the event by Professor Dave Petley
Google Maps image of the cove
OpenStreetMap image of the cove

1993 mining disasters
Landslides in Malaysia
1993 in Malaysia
Manjung District
Megafloods
Landslides in 1993
1993 disasters in Malaysia